The Rafael Manzano Prize for New Traditional Architecture is an award organized by INTBAU, thanks to the contribution of Richard H. Driehaus Charitable Lead Trust, with the support of the Serra Henriques Foundation, the Royal Academy of Fine Arts of San Fernando and Hispania Nostra, and with the High Sponsorship of the Presidency of the Portuguese Republic.

It is awarded annually to architects who have carried out, in Portugal or in Spain, restoration works of monuments or other architectural interventions that have stood out for their contribution to the preservation, promotion and dissemination of the values of classical and traditional architecture.

The award is named after the architect Rafael Manzano Martos, who has devoted his career to the preservation of the Spanish architectural and urban heritage, both through restoration works and by designing new architectures based on this heritage, for which he received the international 2010 Richard H. Driehaus Prize, becoming the first, and until now the only, Spanish architect to have received this award.

The Prize includes a monetary award of €50,000 and a commemorative medal, making it the largest architecture prize awarded on the Iberian Peninsula.

History 

For his contribution in the defense and promotion of traditional architecture, Rafael Manzano Martos was awarded the 8th Richard H. Driehaus Prize in 2010, granted since 2003 in the United States by the American philanthropist Richard H. Driehaus through the University of Notre Dame School of Architecture.

Coinciding with the presentation of this award to Rafael Manzano, considered as the most important in the world for a career dedicated to traditional and classical architecture, Richard H. Driehaus announced the creation in Spain of a new award to defend the Iberian urban heritage and architectural traditions: the Rafael Manzano Prize for New Traditional Architecture.

This award was first awarded in 2012 at a ceremony held at the Royal Academy of Fine Arts in San Fernando in Madrid, and has been awarded every year since then. In 2017, thanks to the collaboration with the Serra Henriques Foundation and the Portuguese Order of Architects, as well as the High Sponsorship of the Presidency of the Portuguese Republic, the award was extended to Portugal and is now granted to professionals from either country.

Laureates

See also 
New Classical Architecture
Traditional Architecture
Driehaus Architecture Prize

External links 

Official Website of the Rafael Manzano Prize

References 

Awards established in 2012
Architecture awards
Architecture in Portugal
Architecture in Spain
Vernacular architecture
New Classical architecture